William Hendley (16 November 1834 – 4 September 1895) was a New Zealand cricketer. He played eight first-class matches for Otago between 1864 and 1873.

See also
 List of Otago representative cricketers

References

External links
 

1834 births
1895 deaths
British emigrants to New Zealand
Cricketers from Hertfordshire
New Zealand cricketers
Otago cricketers